Maria Eithne McNamara is an Irish palaeontologist. She is Professor of Palaeobiology at University College Cork.

McNamara's research focuses on the preservation of soft tissues in the fossil record, fossil colour, and feather evolution.

Life and work 

McNamara obtained her undergraduate degree at the University of Galway in 2002. In 2007 she was awarded a PhD by University College Dublin (UCD) in 2007 with a thesis focusing on taphonomy. After a two year postdoc at UCD, McNamara spent a year as a geopark geologist at the Burren and Cliffs of Moher Geopark. She returned to academia in 2009 after being awarded a Marie Curie Postdoctoral Fellow at Yale University. In 2012 McNamara did further postdoctoral research on feather coloration at the University of Bristol, and in 2013 she was given the position of lecturer at University College Cork (UCC).

In 2016 McNamara was one of the eight women to be painted by Vera Klute in honour of being the recipient of European Research Council Starter Grants. The painting is on permanent exhibition at the Royal Irish Academy. McNamara became professor at UCC in 2020.

McNamara also does public outreach of science and has hosted exhibits, science festivals, and conferences. She has also appeared on RTE's documentary The Island.

Accolates 
 Hodson Fund of the Palaeontological Association in 2014.

Selected publications 
 M.E. McNamara, V. Rossi, T.S. Slater, C.S. Rogers, A.-L. Ducrest, S. Dubey, A. Roulin, 2021. Decoding the evolution of melanin in vertebrates. Trends in Ecology & Evolution 36(5): 430-443.
 M.E. McNamara, 2016. Fossilization of melanosomes via sulfurization. Palaeontology 56(3): 337-350.
 M.E. McNamara, 2013. The taphonomy of colour in fossil insects and feathers. Palaeontology 56(3): 557-575.
 M.E. McNamara, 2012. The original colours of fossil beetles. Proceedings of the Royal Society B: Biological Sciences 279(1731): 1114-1121.

References 

1980 births
Irish paleontologists
Living people
Paleobiologists